The Hart Mine Formation is a geologic formation controversially defined from exposures in south-central New Mexico. It preserves fossils dating back to the Eocene epoch.

Description
The formation is mostly calcareous reddish-brown siltstone, which makes up 72% of the type section. The remainder is mostly conglomerate with only minor silty mudstone. The conglomerate is primarily Paleozoic limestone with lesser amounts of granite. The formation lies disconformably on Crevasse Canyon Formation and grades above into the Spears Formation.

The formation provides evidence for a pulse of Laramide deformation in New Mexico 50 million years ago.

Fossils
The formation contains fossils of turtles, the lizard Glyptosaurus, the brontothere Telmatherium manteoceras, the rodent Reithroparamys huerfanensis, the insectivore Leptotomus parvus, the equid Orohippus pumilis, and the primate Notharctus tenebrosus, pointing to a Bridgerian age for the formation.

History of investigation
The formation was first defined by Spencer G. Lucas and Thomas E. Williamson in 1993 and named for the Hart Mine, an abandoned coal mine. The beds were formerly assigned to the Baca Formation but show differences in lithology and appear to have been deposited in a different sedimentary basin. However, the reassignment was disputed by Cather and collaborators, who argued that the lithological distinction is not great and the basin reconstruction was still speculative. Lucas responded in turn that the Hart Mine Formation has more abundant conglomerate than the Baca Formation and argued that this makes it lithologically distinct. However, the reassignment continues to be controversial.

See also

 List of fossiliferous stratigraphic units in New Mexico
 Paleontology in New Mexico

Footnotes

References
 
 
 
 
 
 

Paleogene formations of New Mexico